The Sergeants-at-Arms of the House of Commons of Canada is a senior officer for the legislative body appointed by Governor General-in-Council through letter patent under the Great Seal of Canada. The Sergeant-at Arms assists the Clerk of the House of Commons as head of parliamentary precinct services, performing certain administrative and ceremonial functions, and maintaining order and security in the parliamentary buildings.

Ceremonial functions performed by the sergeant-at-arms includes administering the Canadian oath of allegiance to newly elected members of the House of Commons. Additionally it is the sergeant-at-arms’ responsibility to bring the ceremonial mace into the legislative chambers before the Speaker of the House of Commons enters the chambers. The sergeant-at-arms occupies a bar in the chambers until proceedings are completed, after which he removes the ceremonial mace from the chambers.

Ten individuals have been appointed to the position since Canadian Confederation in 1867. All previous appointees previously held positions in the Canadian military or the Royal Canadian Mounted Police; although there is no requirement that requires appointees to be drawn from these services. The current Sergeant-at-Arms is Pat McDonell, who was formally appointed to the position in July 2019.

List of sergeant-at-arms

Notes

References

Sergeants-at-Arms